s-Hertogenbosch Oost railway station serves the city of 's-Hertogenbosch in the North Brabant province of the Netherlands.

History
The station was opened in 1987 and is located on the Brabantselijn (Nijmegen - Tilburg). The train services are operated by Nederlandse Spoorwegen.

The main station of 's-Hertogenbosch is 's-Hertogenbosch.

Train services
The following services currently call at 's-Hertogenbosch Oost:
2x per hour local services (stoptrein) Nijmegen - Oss - 's-Hertogenbosch

External links
NS website 
Dutch Public Transport journey planner 

Railway stations in 's-Hertogenbosch
Railway stations opened in 1987
1987 establishments in the Netherlands
Railway stations in the Netherlands opened in the 20th century